William Henry Tyers (March 27, 1870 - April 18, 1924) was an American musician and conductor.

Tyers arranged the songs for The Policy Players, Bert Williams, and George Walker's second New York City musical.

Some of his work was published by Gotham-Attucks Music Publishing Company.

References

American musicians